Les Williams may refer to:

Les Williams (Australian footballer) (1923–1998), Australian rules footballer for the South Melbourne Football Club
Les Williams (Welsh footballer) (1905–1974), Welsh football winger
Les Williams (surfer), surfing companion of Nick Gabaldon
Les Williams (actor), in the 2007 film Kiss the Bride

See also 
Leslie Williams (disambiguation)
Lesley Williams (1932–2016), Australian geneticist